Katarzynki may refer to:
Toruń gingerbread
Katarzynki, Kuyavian-Pomeranian Voivodeship (north-central Poland)
Katarzynki, Greater Poland Voivodeship (west-central Poland)
Katarzynki, Lubusz Voivodeship (west Poland)
Katarzynki, Pomeranian Voivodeship (north Poland)
Katarzynki, Warmian-Masurian Voivodeship (north Poland)